The following pages list cities in the State of Palestine:
 List of cities administered by the State of Palestine
 List of cities in the Gaza Strip
 List of Israeli settlements with city status in the West Bank

Smaller settlements in the State of Palestine are governed as a municipality or as a village council.

See also
List of depopulated Israeli settlements in the Gaza Strip

Palestinian politics